Chorbogh is a village in Sughd Region, northern Tajikistan. It is part of the jamoat Kosatarosh in the city of Panjakent.

Name
Chorbogh in Persian means four gardens. Char/Chor(چار) means four and Bak(باغ) means garden.

References

Populated places in Sughd Region